Diana Frost Shelstad (born August 19, 1947) is a mathematician known for her work in automorphic forms.  She is a professor at Rutgers University–Newark.  She earned her doctorate at Yale University in 1974 studying real reductive algebraic groups.

Research 

Shelstad has been a key player in the development of the theory of endoscopy which is part of Langlands program.  She co-conjectured the fundamental lemma with Robert Langlands in 1984.  After over 20 years, this conjecture was solved by Ngô Bảo Châu in 2009, thus opening up a wealth of consequences.

In 1999, Shelstad developed a theory of twisted endoscopy with Robert Kottwitz.  In 2008–9 she completed work on tempered endoscopy.

Awards and honors
In 2012 she became a fellow of the American Mathematical Society.

Selected papers 
Compositio Mathematica, 39 (1979), no. 1, 11–45.
 Langlands, R.; Shelstad, D. On principal values on p-adic manifolds. Lie group representations, II (College Park, Md., 1982/1983), 250–279, Lecture Notes in Math., 1041, Springer, Berlin, 1984.
 Kottwitz, R. and D. Shelstad Foundations of Twisted Endoscopy, Asterisque, vol. 255, 1999 
 Shelstad, D. On geometric transfer in real twisted endoscopy. Annals of Mathematics 176 (2012), no. 3, 1919-1985.

References

External links
 
 August 2008 talk, Banff International Research Station (iTunes)
 http://publications.ias.edu/rpl/series.php?series=51
 https://sites.rutgers.edu/diana-shelstad

1947 births
Living people
Yale University alumni
Rutgers University faculty
20th-century Australian mathematicians
21st-century Australian mathematicians
Fellows of the American Mathematical Society
Scientists from Sydney
20th-century women mathematicians
21st-century women mathematicians